Elena Sergeyevna Efaieva (born 6 June 1989) is a Russian former pair skater. With Alexei Menshikov, she placed sixth at the 2005 World Junior Championships and at the 2007 European Championships. Their partnership ended in 2007.

In the 2007-2008 season, Efaieva competed with Sergei Roslyakov. They placed tenth at the 2008 Russian Championships. Following that season, Efaieva teamed up with Artem Patlasov, with whom she placed eighth at the 2009 Russian Championships.

Programs 
(with Menshikov)

Competitive highlights

With Patlasov

With Roslyakov

With Menshikov

References 

1989 births
Living people
People from Glazov
Russian female pair skaters
Figure skaters at the 2007 Winter Universiade
Sportspeople from Perm, Russia